Dark Gulch is a valley in San Mateo County, California associated with a small stream that is a tributary of Pescadero Creek.

References

See also
List of watercourses in the San Francisco Bay Area

Rivers of San Mateo County, California
Valleys of California
Rivers of Northern California
Valleys of San Mateo County, California